The Nandi Award for Best Debut Director winners since 1981:

References

Debut Director
Directorial debut film awards